At the 1948 Winter Olympics in St. Moritz, Switzerland, the six alpine skiing events were held on Piz Nair from Monday, 2 February to Thursday, 5 February 1948.

After these games, the giant slalom was added and the combined event was dropped as an Olympic medal event for four decades, until 1988. From 1956 through 1980, the combined continued as an FIS medal event for the concurrent World Championships, using the results from three events, conducted as a "paper race."

Henri Oreiller of France earned a medal in all three events, with two golds and a bronze. Trude Beiser of Austria and Gretchen Fraser of the United States both won two medals, a gold and a silver each.

The first Olympics after World War II did not invite Germany or Japan.

Medal summary

Men's events

Source:

Women's events

Source:

Medal table

Source:

Course information

Participating nations

Twenty-five nations sent alpine skiers to compete. Despite being a part of the Axis until 1943, Italy was invited; Germany and Japan were excluded.

References

External links
Olympic.org – 1948 St. Moritz
 Alpine skiing medalists
FIS-Ski.com – results – 1948 Winter Olympics
International Olympic Committee results database

 
1948 Winter Olympics events
Alpine skiing at the Winter Olympics
1948 in alpine skiing
Alpine skiing competitions in Switzerland